Mk IV LCU class vessels are follow on class of Mk. III LCU operated by the Indian Navy. The Mk IV LCU can be deployed for maritime roles that require amphibious capabilities.

History 

The last ship of the class was delivered on 31 December 2020 and was commissioned into service on 18 March 2021.

Design 
The ship is 63 metres long, overall beam of 11 metres, a hull draught of 2.2 metres and displaces around 830 tonnes. They are powered by two MTU 16V 4000 M53 marine diesel engines (each 1840 KWs). They are equipped with two 30mm CRN-91 mounted guns with a Bharat Electronics-built EON-51 electro-optic director.

The LCU can carry up to 216 personnel and 145 tonnes of cargo. It is fitted with a hydraulic bow ramp.

Ships of the class

Gallery

See also 
 List of active Indian Navy ships
 Future ships of the Indian Navy

References

External links
 LCU Mk IV on GRSE website

Naval ships of India
Ships built in India
Landing craft